Maxillipiidae is a family of crustaceans belonging to the order Amphipoda.

Genera:
 Maxillipides Ledoyer, 1984
 Maxillipius Ledoyer, 1973

References

Amphipoda